The term aeroplane (equivalent to "airplane" in U.S. English) typically refers to any powered fixed-wing aircraft.

Aeroplane may also refer to:

In music

Performers
 Aeroplane (musician) (Vito De Luca), a Belgian nu-disco musician
 The Aeroplanes, an English rock band from Liverpool

Recordings
 Aeroplane (album), a 1999 album by Curt Smith
 In the Aeroplane Over the Sea, a 1998 album by Neutral Milk Hotel
 "Aeroplane" (Red Hot Chili Peppers song), 1995
 "Aeroplane", a song by Robert Palmer from the 1990 album Don't Explain
 "Aeroplane", a song by Björk from her 1993 album Debut
 "Aeroplane", a song by Imogen Heap from the 1998 album iMegaphone
 "Aeroplane", a song by Reamonn from the 2008 album Reamonn

Other uses
 Aeroplane Jelly, an Australian brand of gelatin dessert
 Phaedyma shepherdi, or the Common Aeroplane, a medium-sized butterfly
 Aeroplane (magazine), a British magazine devoted to aviation history and preservation

See also 
 Aircraft
 Airplane (disambiguation)